The 2006 Tennis Masters Cup was a men's tennis tournament played on indoor hard courts. It was the 37th edition of the year-end singles championships, the 32nd edition of the year-end doubles championships, and was part of the 2006 ATP Tour. It took place at the Qizhong Forest Sports City Arena in Shanghai, People's Republic of China, from November 12 through November 19, 2006.

Finals

Singles

 Roger Federer defeated  James Blake 6–0, 6–3, 6–4
 It was Federer's 12th title of the year, and his 45th overall. It was his 3rd year-end championships title.

Doubles

 Jonas Björkman /  Max Mirnyi defeated  Mark Knowles /  Daniel Nestor 6–2, 6–4

Points and prize money

RR is points or prize money won in the round robin stage.
1 Prize money for doubles is per team.
An undefeated singles champion would earn the maximum 750 points and $1,520,000 in prize money ($120,000 participation, $360,000 undefeated round robin, $370,000 semifinal win, $700,000 final win)
An undefeated doubles champion would earn the maximum 750 points and $220,000 in prize money ($50,000 participation, $45,000 undefeated round robin, $25,000 semifinal win, $100,000 final win). While each of them would get 1,500 points, the $220,000 would be split, so $110,000 for each member of the team.

Points breakdown

Singles

Doubles

References

External links
Official website
Singles draw
Doubles draw

 
Tennis Masters Cup
2006
Tennis tournaments in China
Sports competitions in Shanghai
2006 in Chinese tennis